Cristopher is a given name that may refer to:

 Cristopher Ballinas Valdés
 Cristopher Moore
 Cristopher Nilstorp
 Cristopher Toselli
 Cristopher Tronco Sánchez
 Cristopher Unterberger

See also 
 Christopher (given name)
 Cristian (disambiguation)

Masculine given names